Anthony Michael Cingrani (born July 5, 1989) is an American professional baseball pitcher who is a free agent. He has played in Major League Baseball (MLB) for the Cincinnati Reds and Los Angeles Dodgers. Prior to playing professionally, he played for his high school baseball team at Lincoln-Way Central High School and for the college baseball teams at South Suburban College and Rice University.

Amateur career
Cingrani attended Lincoln-Way Central High School in New Lenox, Illinois. After graduating, he enrolled at South Suburban College, a junior college in South Holland, Illinois, before transferring to Rice University, where he played for the Rice Owls baseball team. In his junior year, his first at Rice, Cingrani struggled as a starting pitcher, pitching to an 8.59 earned run average (ERA) in six games started, issuing 16 walks and striking out only 13. After the season, he asked the coaches if they wanted him off the team due to his poor performance, but they told him they thought he could make progress.

Cingrani worked with Rice's coaches to change his mechanics during the offseason, which resulted in improved fastball velocity: from  before the changes to  after. However, he did not make the Owls' starting rotation due to the inconsistency of his off-speed pitches. Converted into a relief pitcher for his senior season, Cingrani tied the school record with 12 saves. He also had a 4–2 win–loss record, a 1.74 ERA and struck out 66 batters while walking only 10 in 57 innings pitched.

Professional career

Cincinnati Reds
The Cincinnati Reds selected Cingrani in the third round, with the 114th selection, of the 2011 Major League Baseball draft. He began his professional career with the Billings Mustangs of the Rookie-level Pioneer League, pitching in their starting rotation. He posted a 1.75 ERA in 13 games started.

Cingrani began the 2012 season with the Bakersfield Blaze of the Class A-Advanced California League, and received a mid-season promotion to the Pensacola Blue Wahoos of the Class AA Southern League. He led all of minor league baseball with a 1.73 ERA. The Reds promoted Cingrani to the major leagues on September 4, 2012. He made his major league debut on September 9, throwing three innings in relief.

After starter Johnny Cueto was placed on the disabled list, Cingrani was called up by the Reds on April 18, 2013, to take the starting rotation spot for Cueto until Cueto was reactivated. In July, Cingrani bounced between the rosters of the Cincinnati Reds and the Arizona League Reds. He was optioned to the AZL Reds on July 17, recalled on July 23, optioned on July 24, and recalled on July 28. He did not appear in any games for the AZL Reds during this period.

During spring training in 2015, the Reds announced that Cingrani would serve as a relief pitcher during the season.

The next two seasons, Cingrani pitched to ERAs of 5.67 and 4.14 respectively. The 2017 season did not start any better for Cingrani, posting a 5.40 ERA while playing for the Cincinnati Reds.

Los Angeles Dodgers
Cingrani was traded to the Los Angeles Dodgers on July 31, 2017, in exchange for outfielder Scott Van Slyke and minor league catcher Hendrik Clementina.

Cingrani pitched in 19 innings in 22 games for the Dodgers during the 2017 season, posting a 2.79 ERA.  In the postseason, he made two appearances in each of the NLDS and NLCS, giving up no runs and allowing only a single and a hit by pitch. He appeared in three games during the 2017 World Series, allowing one run to score on two hits with two strikeouts in three innings. After the season, he signed a one-year, $2.3 million, contract with the Dodgers for 2018, to avoid salary arbitration. On May 4, 2018, against the San Diego Padres at Estadio de Béisbol Monterrey, Cingrani was one of four pitchers involved in a combined no-hitter as the Dodgers won 4–0. Cingrani was limited to just 30 appearances on the season, posting a record of 1–2 with an ERA of 4.76. In the second half of 2018, Cingrani suffered a shoulder injury that kept him out for the rest of the season. In March 2019, he suffered a recurrence of the injury and the Dodgers shut him down for Spring Training. On May 4, he started a rehab assignment with the High-A Rancho Cucamonga Quakes team. On May 8, his rehab assignment was moved to Triple-A Oklahoma City. In June 2019, Cingrani underwent arthroscopic surgery to fix a left labrum tear and was ruled out for the season.

St. Louis Cardinals
On July 31, 2019, the Dodgers traded Cingrani and Jeffry Abreu to the St. Louis Cardinals in exchange for Jedd Gyorko, international cap space, and cash considerations. On October 31, 2019, Cingrani became a free agent.

Lexington Legends
On May 13, 2021, Cingrani signed with the Lexington Legends of the Atlantic League of Professional Baseball. Cingrani recorded a stellar 1.13 ERA in 8 appearances with Lexington.

Chicago Cubs
On June 28, 2021, Cingrani's contract was purchased by the Chicago Cubs organization.
Cingrani appeared in 12 games for the Triple-A Iowa Cubs, posting a 3.60 ERA with 15 strikeouts. On August 25, Cingrani was released by the Cubs.

See also

 List of Major League Baseball single-inning strikeout leaders
 List of Major League Baseball no-hitters

References

External links

Rice Owls bio

1989 births
Living people
Bakersfield Blaze players
Baseball players from Illinois
Billings Mustangs players
Cincinnati Reds players
Lexington Legends players
Louisville Bats players
Los Angeles Dodgers players
Major League Baseball pitchers
Pensacola Blue Wahoos players
People from Evergreen Park, Illinois
People from New Lenox, Illinois
Rice Owls baseball players
South Suburban Bulldogs baseball players
Rancho Cucamonga Quakes players
Oklahoma City Dodgers players